Crosswick is an unincorporated community in central Wayne Township, Warren County, Ohio, United States, located just outside Waynesville.

History
Crosswick (also known historically as Crosswicks) was platted by James Jennings in July 1821.

References

Unincorporated communities in Warren County, Ohio
Unincorporated communities in Ohio
Populated places established in 1821